Jorge Ramirez (born 25 May 1986 in Montevideo) is a Uruguayan football striker. He currently plays for Sud América.

Ramírez began his career in 2008, playing for Club Atlético Progreso before transferring to Club Nacional de Fútbol the following year. In 2010, he signed with the Bolivian side Oriente Petrolero for one year.

External links 
 2010 Apertura Top Goal Scorer
 
 

1986 births
Living people
Uruguayan footballers
Uruguayan expatriate footballers
Footballers from Montevideo
Club Nacional de Football players
Real C.D. España players
C.A. Progreso players
Atenas de San Carlos players
Central Español players
Oriente Petrolero players
C.A. Rentistas players
Rocha F.C. players
A.D. Isidro Metapán footballers
Deportivo Pasto footballers
Patriotas Boyacá footballers
Guayaquil City F.C. footballers
Deportivo Binacional FC players
Alianza Atlético footballers
Sud América players
Bolivian Primera División players
Uruguayan Primera División players
Categoría Primera A players
Liga Nacional de Fútbol Profesional de Honduras players
Ecuadorian Serie A players
Peruvian Primera División players
Peruvian Segunda División players
Association football forwards
Expatriate footballers in Bolivia
Expatriate footballers in El Salvador
Expatriate footballers in Honduras
Expatriate footballers in Colombia
Expatriate footballers in Ecuador
Expatriate footballers in Peru
Uruguayan expatriate sportspeople in Bolivia
Uruguayan expatriate sportspeople in Honduras
Uruguayan expatriate sportspeople in El Salvador
Uruguayan expatriate sportspeople in Colombia
Uruguayan expatriate sportspeople in Ecuador
Uruguayan expatriate sportspeople in Peru